Horsens Idræts Club Basketball, commonly known as Horsens IC or Horsens, is a professional basketball team based in Horsens, Denmark. The club plays at the Forum Horsens, which can accommodate 4,000 people.

The team holds six titles in the Basketligaen, Denmark's top basketball league.

Honours
Basketligaen
Winners (6): 1991–92, 1993–94, 1997–98, 2005–06, 2014–15, 2015–16
Danish Cup
Winners (3): 1992, 1995, 2015, 2019

Players

Current roster

Notables

Players

Coaches
To appear in this section a coach must have either:
– Set a club record or won an individual award as a professional coach.
– Coached at least one official international match for a senior national team at any time.

Season by season

References

Basketball teams established in 1978
Basketball teams in Denmark
Horsens